Odd Little Man (Norwegian title: Da jeg traff Jesus... med sprettert) is a Norwegian family movie from 2000, directed by Stein Leikanger, based on one of the biographic memoirs of Odd Børretzen. The title of the movie is a Norwegian pun: the first part of the Norwegian title means "When I met Jesus", and the second part means "...with a slingshot", thus changing the meaning of the title to "When I hit Jesus ... with a slingshot", as the word 'traff' can mean 'hit' or 'met' depending on the context. The English titles makes use of the coincidence that Børretzen's Norwegian first name has another meaning in English.

This movie was the Norwegian entry to the Academy Award for Best Foreign Language Film in 2001.

External links 
 

2000 films
Norwegian comedy films
2000s Norwegian-language films
Films based on biographies